Schmidtia is a genus of Asian and African plants in the grass family.

The genus name of Schmidtia is in honour of Franz Wilibald Schmidt (1875–1949), who was an Italian botanist and mycologist.

Species
As accepted by Kew;
 Schmidtia kalahariensis Stent  - Chad, Sudan, Angola, Namibia, Botswana, South Africa
 Schmidtia pappophoroides Steud. ex J.A.Schmidt	 - arid and semiarid parts of Africa from Mauritania to Egypt to South Africa, and also Pakistan

Formerly included;
Several names have been coined with the name Schmidtia but are now regarded as better suited to other genera (Coleanthus and Tolpis)
 Schmidtia capensis - Tolpis capensis
 Schmidtia subtilis  - Coleanthus subtilis
 Schmidtia utriculata - Coleanthus subtilis
 Schmidtia utriculosa - Coleanthus subtilis

References

Poaceae genera
Chloridoideae
Flora of Northeast Tropical Africa
Flora of East Tropical Africa
Flora of South Tropical Africa
Flora of Southern Africa